The Outer Ones is the seventh studio album by American technical death metal band Revocation, released on September 28, 2018, via Metal Blade. Some of the songs are inspired from H.P. Lovecraft's works.

It is the band's final album to feature rhythm guitarist Dan Gargiulo before his departure in June 2020.

Track listing

Personnel
Revocation
 Dave Davidson – lead guitar, lead vocals
 Dan Gargiulo – rhythm guitar, backing vocals
 Brett Bamberger – bass
 Ash Pearson – drums

Production and design
 Zeuss – production, recording, mixing, mastering
 Revocation – production
 Shane Frisby – recording 
 Sean Fitzpatrick – editing 
 Richard Houghten – mastering 
 Tom Strom – artwork
 Brian Ames – layout

Charts

References

2018 albums
Albums produced by Chris "Zeuss" Harris
Metal Blade Records albums
Revocation (band) albums